The Visma Arena or Växjö Arena is a football stadium in Växjö, Sweden and the home of Superettan club Östers IF. The stadium is a part of a large redevelopment of the area formerly known as Värendsvallen into Arenastaden, which also includes a new ice hockey arena, floorball arena and a dedicated indoor athletics arena. Between 2012 and 2020, it was known as Myresjöhus Arena.

History
On 29 March 2011 it was announced that the house builder Myresjöhus had purchased the naming rights to the stadium for an undisclosed amount.  Myresjöhus Arena is a dedicated football stadium with a capacity of 12,000 (10,000 seated), with the entire audience under roof. The stadium conforms to UEFA category 3 for international games as well as Svenska Fotbollförbundets upcoming demands for stadiums in Allsvenskan. The official groundbreaking took place on 31 March 2011 and was led by Lars-Åke Lagrell, chairman of Svenska Fotbollförbundet. The first competitive football match at the stadium was played on 3 September 2012 between Småland rivals Östers IF and IFK Värnamo in Superettan, ending in a 1–1 draw.

Structure and facilities
Facts and figures in short:
 Seated audience: 10 000
 Standing audience: 2 000
 Gates: 4
 Boxes: 16
 Restaurants: 2
 Pubs: 2
 Toilets: 144
 20 places for wheelchairs with adjacent seating for personal assistants
 Playing area 105x68, field area 120x80

UEFA Women's Euro 2013
The stadium hosted three first round games and one quarter-final at UEFA Women's Euro 2013. During the finals it was known as the 'Växjö Arena' for sponsorship reasons.

The following matches were played at the stadium during the UEFA Women's Euro 2013:

Other uses

International football matches

Records
 Record attendance: 12,173, Östers IF against IFK Värnamo, 3 September 2012.

Panorama image

Awards
 Winner of Växjö Municipality building prize 2013.
 Stadium of the year (2012) nominee at StadiumDB.com.

External links

 
 Myresjöhus Arena at the official website of Östers IF
 360 degree view of the stadium at the official website of Östers IF

References

Football venues in Sweden
Sports venues in Växjö
Östers IF
Sports venues completed in 2012
UEFA Women's Euro 2013 venues
2012 establishments in Sweden